Uganda Management Institute (UMI) is a government-owned national center for training, research, and consultancy in the field of management and administration in Uganda. It is one of the nine public universities and degree-awarding institutions in the country outside the military.

Location
The geographical coordinates of UMI are: 0°19'16.0"N, 32°35'52.0"E
(Latitude:0.321111; Longitude:32.597778).

History
UMI began training operations in 1968 under the name Uganda Institute of Public Administration. The official opening of UMI was held on 7 October 1969. In the initial years, UMI was mandated to conduct intensive in-service training to quickly develop a cadre of Africans to assume higher responsibilities upon the attainment of independence in 1962.

In the early 1970s, UMI became affiliated with Makerere University, offering postgraduate diplomas in public administration and business management. The postgraduate diploma in human resource management was introduced in the mid 1980s.

Before 1992, the Institute of Public Administration operated as a department of the Ministry of Public Service. This status changed with the enactment of the Uganda Management Institute Statute of 1992. The statute conferred an agency status to UMI with a great degree of autonomy under a governing board. The programs of UMI were expanded and student intake increased. By 1999, UMI was offering a master's degree in management studies besides six postgraduate diplomas, certificate courses, and short courses.

Schools
As of July 2014, UMI was structured into the following schools:

 School of Civil Service, Public Administration and Governance
 School of Business and Management
 School for Distance Learning and Information Technology
 School of Management Sciences
 Regional Centres; at Gulu, Mbale and Mbarara

Outreach centers
The center is located in the Mbarara District Administration Building at Kamukuzi, Mbarara and offers various short courses and postgraduate diploma programs. Using state-of-the-art pedagogical technology, the center is linked to the main UMI campus in Kampala via a virtual face-to-face video conferencing facility that complements well with the programme delivery methods. In 2008, UMI established an outreach center in the city of Gulu in the Northern Region of Uganda.

Programs
UMI offers the following courses at the main campus in Kampala. Some of the courses are also offered at the three outreach centers.

Ordinary Diploma Courses
 Diploma in Information Management
 Diploma in Accounting and Financial Management
 Diploma in Administration
 Diploma in Public Procurement and Contract Management
 Diploma in Information and Communication Technology
 Diploma in Logistics and Materials Management
Postgraduate Diploma Courses
 Diploma in Human Resource Management
 Diploma in Public Administration and Management
 Diploma in Financial Management
 Diploma in Marketing Management
 Diploma in Procurement and Supply Chain Management
 Diploma in Project Planning and Management
 Diploma in Management
 Diploma in Urban Governance and Management
 Diploma in Resource Mobilization and Management
 Diploma in Business Administration
 Diploma in Logistics and Distribution Management
 Diploma in Information Systems Management
Professional Courses
 ACCA - (Association of Chartered Certified Accountants)
 CIPS - (Chartered Institute of Purchasing and Supplies)
 CIM  - (Chartered Institute of Marketing)
Master's degrees
 Masters in Management Studies (MMS) 
 Masters in Business Administration (MBA)
 Master of Public Administration (MPA)
 Master of Science in Marketing (MSc.Mkt)
 Masters in Institutional Management and Leadership (MIML)
 Doctorate degrees
UMI offers the degree of Doctor of Philosophy (PhD) in management and administration.

See also
 List of Business Schools in Uganda
 List of universities in Uganda
 Education in Uganda

References

External links
  Uganda Management Institute Homepage

Uganda Management Institute
Educational institutions established in 1968
Organisations based in Kampala
Kampala Central Division
1968 establishments in Uganda
Business schools in Uganda